"The Glorious Motherland" (Korean: 빛나는 조국) is a song of Democratic People's Republic of Korea (DPRK, normally North Korea).
It was composed by Ri Myon-sang (리면상) in 1947, and its lyrics were written by Pak Se-yong (박세영).

History 

In 1946-1947 when North Korea had no national anthem, composition of the anthem called Aegukka was undertaken under the leadership of Kim Il-sung. In 1947, two candidates remained for the final judgement, and one of the two was selected for the anthem. The other one, apparently which is known today as "The Glorious Motherland," was also decided to be opened to the public with its title changed from Aegukka, as the melody was excellent. This song is listed in songbooks of that time as one of the representative songs, e.g. "조쏘歌曲100曲集 (Korea-Soviet Collection of 100 Songs)" (北朝鮮音樂同盟 (Ed.), 1949).

With such a background, this song has been used in principal events of North Korea. The song is broadcast at the sign-off of Korean Central Television with the image of fluttering national flag.

See also 
 Aegukka
 Music of North Korea

References

Notes

External links 
 Introduction and music at dprktoday.com (archive as of December 12, 2017)

North Korean songs
1947 songs
Songs about North Korea